The Connecticut Cyclones is a team of the Women's Football Alliance.  Based in Hartford, the Cyclones played two seasons in the Women's Professional Football League and one in the Independent Women's Football League before joining the WFA (while they were based in West Haven).

Originally scheduled to begin play in 2009, the Cyclones have since pushed back their inaugural WFA season to 2010, forfeiting their entire 2009 schedule in the process.

Season-By-Season 

|-
| colspan="6" align="center" | Connecticut Cyclones (WPFL)
|-
|2006 || 0 || 5 || 0 || 3rd American East || --
|-
|2007 || 0 || 7 || 0 || 3rd American East || --
|-
| colspan="6" align="center" | Connecticut Cyclones (IWFL)
|-
|2008 || 0 || 4 || 0 || X-Team || --
|-
| colspan="6" align="center" | Connecticut Cyclones (WFA)
|-
|2009 || 0 || 8 || 0 || 6th National Northeast || --
|-
!Totals || 0 || 24 || 0
|colspan="2"| (including playoffs)

References

Connecticut Cyclones official website

Women's Professional Football League teams
Women's Football Alliance teams
Sports teams in Hartford, Connecticut
American football teams in Connecticut
2006 establishments in Connecticut
American football teams established in 2006
Women in Connecticut